Cylindrocline commersonii is a species of flowering plant in the family Asteraceae, named after Philibert Commerson. It is found only in Mauritius. Its natural habitat is subtropical or tropical dry forests.

References

commersonii
Endemic flora of Mauritius
Critically endangered plants
Taxonomy articles created by Polbot